Danby Wiske is a village in the district of Hambleton in North Yorkshire, England. It is the main settlement in the civil parish of Danby Wiske with Lazenby.

History

Danby Wiske was mentioned in the Domesday Book as Danebi. The lands were the property of Kofse at the time of the Norman conquest. After 1086 the manor was granted to Landric of Hornby. There were three households, five ploughlands and six acres of meadow. During the late 13th century and early 14th century, the manor was the subject of dispute. Originally it had passed to the lords of Richmond, who had granted hereditary lordship to Geoffrey le Scrope. When his son Henry inherited the manor the Crown took the title for a short time until it was returned to Henry. However the Crown retook possession upon learning the conditions of inheritance and granted it back to the lords of Richmond in 1342. The manor was leased to Robert Dawe and Edward Thurland in 1602, but in 1616 King James I granted the manor of Danby Wiske to George Calvert, Lord Baltimore, founder of the state of Maryland in the United States. The Calverts sold the manor in 1701 after which it changed hands a couple of times until in 1718 it was bought by Sir Hugh Smithson. It was sold to Jonathon Wharton in 1765. By 1857, the manor was in the possession of the Venerable Archdeacon Cust

Danby Wiske is around ¼ mile from the East Coast Main Line; there was once a railway station here, but this has long since closed. The ancient parish of Danby Wiske included Yafforth as well as Streetlam, but not Lazenby. Yafforth became a separate civil parish in 1866.

The etymology of the name derives from the Old Norse words Danir and by meaning the farm of the Danes. The suffix of Wiske refers to the nearby river.

Lazenby had a separate history until modern times.  It was historically an extra parochial area.  It became a separate civil parish in 1858, and was joined to the ecclesiastical parish of Northallerton in 1867.

Geography and governance

The village lies on a minor road between the village of Streetlam and the A167 near Northallerton. There is a crossroads in the centre of the village, with another minor road leading to the nearby village of Yafforth.

Danby Wiske is the lowest point on the  Coast to Coast Walk, originated and described by Alfred Wainwright.
The parish of Danby Wiske with Lazenby includes the village of Streetlam about 2 miles west of Danby Wiske.  Lazenby consists of a few scattered houses east of Danby Wiske.

The village lies within the UK Parliamentary constituency of Richmond (Yorkshire). It also lies within the Swale electoral division of North Yorkshire County Council and the Morton-on-Swale ward of Hambleton District Council. There are five members of the local Parish Council.

Demography

2001 Census

According to the 2001 UK Census, the parish was 47.9% male and 52.1% female of the total population of 378. The religious make-up was 83.9% Christian with the rest stating no religion. The ethnic distribution was 100% White There were 157 dwellings.

2011 Census

According to the 2011 UK Census, the parish had a total population of 366 with 48.4% male and 51.6% female. The religious make-up was 72.7% Christian, a small Buddhist minority with the rest stating no religion. The ethnic distribution was 99.5% White with a small Black British minority. There were 155 dwellings.

Community

There is a Village Hall, built in 1978 and extended in 2010, which is used for fundraising, community activities and social functions. The village once had a school but this too closed long ago; the village children now attend schools in Northallerton or surrounding villages such as East Cowton and Great Smeaton. There is a Post Box with daily 4 p.m. weekday collections. There is a children's play park, opened in June 2018, with the field behind, owned by the village committee, being opened in 2019. There is a 17th-century public house, The White Swan, in the village.

Religion

The village church is undedicated and known simply as Danby Wiske Parish Church and is a Grade I Listed Building. The doorway and font in the nave both date from Norman times. The church tower underwent a small restoration program in early 2010.

Notable residents

George Calvert, lord of Danby Wiske Manor from 1616. Later became Lord Baltimore and founded the state of Maryland in the American Colonies.
Thomas Meriton (b. 1637/8), playwright, was educated at the private school in the village before studying at St John's College, Cambridge.

References

External links

Guide to the coast to coast walk
Danby Wiske Village Website

Villages in North Yorkshire